Chahriq Rural District is in Kuhsar District of Salmas County, West Azerbaijan province, Iran. At the National Census of 2006, its population was 9,450 in 1,744 households. There were 8,941 inhabitants in 1,855 households at the following census of 2011. At the most recent census of 2016, the population of the rural district was 9,435 in 2,276 households. The largest of its 47 villages was Chahriq-e Olya, with 831 people.

References 

Salmas County

Rural Districts of West Azerbaijan Province

Populated places in West Azerbaijan Province

Populated places in Salmas County